Ørskov is a Danish surname. Notable people with the surname include:

Egil Robert Orskov, Danish-born Scottish agricultural scientist and development scholar
Ida Ørskov (1922–2007), Danish physician and bacteriologist
Willy Ørskov (1920–1990), Danish sculptor

Danish-language surnames